Dinkey Creek can refer to:
Dinkey Creek, California, a town in California
Dinkey Creek (California), a tributary of the North Fork Kings River